LZ 74 (navy designation L 32) was an R Class super-zeppelin belonging to the Imperial German Navy.

Missions

The airship took part in three attacks on England dropping  of bombs.

Destroyed

On its final mission LZ 74 was commanded by Kapitan-Leutnant Werner Petersen. The Airship set out with LZ 72, LZ 76 and LZ 78 part of Zeppelin raid on the night of 23 September 1916. 

Second Lieutenant Frederick Sowrey, of 39 Home Defence Squadron, in a Royal Aircraft Factory BE.2C, launched from Sutton Farm at 23:30 hours to patrol toward Joyce Green. He was able to close in with the Zeppelin until he was close enough to fire three drums of incendiary ammunition into its belly. Round after round hit the Airship before it finally exploded in flame. There were no survivors from the aircrew; most of the bodies recovered were charred and burned. The burning wreckage of L 32 fell into farm fields off Green Farm Lane in Great Burstead, crashing at 01.30. The site drew enormous crowds. The crew's bodies 22 in total were buried at Great Burstead Church under 1 mile from the crash site, being buried on the 27th of September 1916, then exhumed in 1966 and reburied at the German Military Cemetery Cannock Chase.

Specifications (LZ 74 / Type R zeppelin)

See also

List of Zeppelins

References 

 

Zeppelins
Airships of the Imperial German Navy
1916 in military history
Military airships of World War I
Individual aircraft
Aircraft first flown in 1916
Disasters in Essex
Aviation accidents and incidents in England